Frederick Darley may refer to:

 Frederick Matthew Darley (1830–1910), Australian judge
 Frederick Darley (architect) (1798–1872), Irish architect